Away is an American luggage and travel accessories retailer. Away is based in New York City. Jen Rubio and Steph Korey started Away in 2015. The company has raised $31 million in financing. It is one of the highest funded female-backed startups.

The company primarily sells products online, but also has brick and mortar locations. Away is a direct-to-consumer retailer, which allows the company to sell directly to consumers without third-party wholesalers or distributors. Its products are available throughout the U.S. and in the U.K.. Away stopped selling their products to continental Europe, but they still process warranty claims through their U.K. outlets.

History

Steph Korey and Jen Rubio met in 2011 as former colleagues on the early executive team at Warby Parker. They founded Away in 2015. It improved upon traditional suitcase designs by adding features such as built-in batteries in their luggage for charging mobile devices. By November, the company had raised $2.5 million in seed funding from investors Accel Partners and Forerunner Ventures. The company's first product, a carry-on became available to ship in February 2016. In September 2016, the company raised an additional $8.5 million in Series A funding for expansion.

The next year, the firm had grown to 66 employees and projected more than $50 million in sales. It raised $20 million in Series B funding led by Global Founders Capital, Forerunner Ventures, Comcast Ventures, and Accel Partners in May 2017. As of May 2018, it had more than 150 employees and announced plans to expand jobs across the company, including a relocation of its headquarters in New York City. In May 2019, it secured $100 million of investment and reached a total valuation of $1.4 billion. The funding round was led by Wellington Management, as well as Baillie Gifford, Lone Pine Capital and Global Founders Capital. The money is intended for building brick-and-mortar stores and expanding travel gear.

Away expanded into editorial content with the launch of a podcast called Airplane Mode in May 2017, and in July 2017, a print and digital travel magazine, Here, which includes city guides, travel essays, and photo journals.

The company was named a "Breakthrough Brand with Ingenious Marketing" by Adweek. Fast Company recognized Away as one of the "2018 Top 10 Most Innovative Companies", and the company was a recipient of Surface Travel Awards.

Toxic workplace allegations

On December 5, 2019, a report from The Verge described a toxic workplace and "culture of intimidation and constant surveillance" at Away in which employee communications channels were restricted while executives used Slack as an internal megaphone to publicly humiliate employees. Employees reported expectations to work long hours, on holidays, at night and late into the evening, and without paid time off. In an apology, CEO Korey said that she was "appalled" to read her own messages and listed steps taken to improve the company's work culture in the last year. Korey initially resigned as CEO on December 9, and the company announced that she was to be succeeded by Stuart Haselden, former COO of Lululemon.

Korey renounced her resignation on January 13, 2020, and stated that she and Haselden would be co-CEOs of Away. In an interview with The New York Times, Korey said that The Verges reporting was "inaccurate" and that it was "not right" for her to resign. The Verge replied, "Steph Korey responding to our reporting by saying her behavior and comments were 'wrong, plain and simple' and then choosing to step down as C.E.O. speaks for itself." Erin Grau, Away's human resources chief, resigned the same day in response to Korey returning.

On July 2, 2020, however, Jen Rubio and Stuart Haseldon announced that Korey would be stepping down as co-CEO "within the year", following comments she made on social media attacking digital-only media companies. Away employees were concerned that her comments meant she had learned nothing from the events in December 2019.

Products

Away produces and markets travel accessories using a direct-to-consumer business model. The company's best-known products are suitcases. Away has since expanded its product line to include travel bags, travel organizers and travel accessories.

The Carry-On was developed based on the focus group feedback. Vogue announced the creation of the luggage in November 2015, labeling it "The Perfect Carry-On." By October 2016, Away had launched three additional sizes: The Bigger Carry-On; The Medium; and The Large. The Bigger Carry-On was an honoree in the 2017 Fast Company Innovation By Design Awards.

Due to the brand's celebrity appeal, People dubbed the luggage "the little black dress of luggage" in August 2017.

References 

Companies based in New York City
Luggage brands
Luggage manufacturers
Private equity portfolio companies
Manufacturing companies established in 2015
Retail companies established in 2015
2015 establishments in New York City
American companies established in 2015
Privately held companies based in New York City